Rhombothyria is a genus of parasitic flies in the family Tachinidae.

Species
Rhombothyria flavicosta Wulp, 1891

Distribution
Mexico.

References

Diptera of North America
Dexiinae
Tachinidae genera
Taxa named by Frederik Maurits van der Wulp
Monotypic Brachycera genera